Cover Me (also known as Cover Me: Based on the True Life of an FBI Family) is an American crime comedy-drama series which ran on the USA Network from March 5, 2000, to March 24, 2001.

Premise
Based on a real family, the series centers on undercover FBI agent Danny Arno, who instead of hiding the details of his work from his wife and children, includes them in his operations.

Cast
Peter Dobson as Danny Arno 
Melora Hardin as Barbara Arno 
Cameron Richardson as Celeste Arno
 Antoinette Picatto as Ruby Arno
Michael Angarano as Chance Arno

David Faustino had the roles of Older Chance and Narrator, but the roles are said to be uncredited.

Episodes

External links

2000s American comedy-drama television series
2000 American television series debuts
2001 American television series endings
2000s American crime drama television series
English-language television shows
Television series by Universal Television
Television shows set in Utah
USA Network original programming